Coenotephria salicata, the striped twin-spot carpet, is a moth of the family Geometridae. It was first described by Michael Denis and Ignaz Schiffermüller in 1775 and is found in most of Europe.

The wingspan is 29–31 mm. Adults have a grey ground colour with darker cross lines which are difficult to distinguish if the forewings are heavily mottled. There are white broken lines along the outer margin of forewings. The larva is moderately stout, pale reddish brown, the dark dorsal line finely pale-edged, the subdorsal line fine, yellowish, the lateral stripe broadly yellow. The spiracles are black; tubercles small,
black, the setae short.

Adults are on wing from May to July, and occasionally again in autumn in a partial second generation.

The larvae feed on Galium species.

Subspecies
Coenotephria salicata latentaria (Curtis, 1830)
Coenotephria salicata probaria (Herrich-Schaffer, 1856) Capri, the Balkans, Greece- a much paler, ash-grey form, sometimes quite whitish 
Coenotephria salicata salicata

References

External links

Striped twin-spot carpet at UKMoths
Lepiforum e.V.

Larentiinae
Moths described in 1775
Moths of Europe
Moths of Asia
Taxa named by Michael Denis
Taxa named by Ignaz Schiffermüller